Born That Way is the second studio album, and third overall album, by the American country music band Boy Howdy. Their final album before disbanding, it was issued in 1995 via Curb Records. It includes the singles "True to His Word", "Bigger Fish to Fry", "She Can't Love You" and "Field of Dreams". Although "True to His Word" peaked at number 23 on the U.S. country charts, the other three singles all missed Top 40.

Track listing

Personnel

Boy Howdy
Cary Park – acoustic guitar, electric guitar, mandolin, background vocals
Larry Park – acoustic guitar, electric guitar, fiddle, background vocals
Jeffrey Steele – bass guitar, lead vocals
Hugh Wright – drums, percussion

Additional musicians
Larry Corbett, Joel Derouin, Henry Ferber, Armand Garabedian, James Getzoff, Sid Page, Michele Richards, Evan Wilson – strings
Dan Dugmore – steel guitar
Chris Farren – acoustic guitar, keyboards, background vocals
John Hobbs – piano, Hammond B-3 organ
Paul Leim – drums
Jay Dee Maness – steel guitar
Kevin Nadeau – piano

Chart performance

References
[ Born That Way] at Allmusic

1995 albums
Boy Howdy albums
Curb Records albums
Albums produced by Chris Farren (country musician)